Mateusz Możdżeń (born 14 March 1991 in Warsaw) is a Polish professional footballer who plays as a midfielder for Polish club Legia Warsaw II.

Career

Club
He made his professional debut in an Ekstraklasa match against Wisła Kraków in October 2009.

On 4 November 2010, he scored a goal against Manchester City in the 2010–11 UEFA Europa League group stages. The goal came on a spectacular long-range strike in the 92nd minute to make the score 3–1, thus securing victory for Lech Poznań.

Career statistics

Club

1 Including Polish SuperCup.

References

External links
 
 

1991 births
Living people
Footballers from Warsaw
Polish footballers
Poland youth international footballers
Poland under-21 international footballers
Association football midfielders
Lech Poznań players
Lechia Gdańsk players
Podbeskidzie Bielsko-Biała players
Korona Kielce players
Zagłębie Sosnowiec players
Widzew Łódź players
Znicz Pruszków players
Legia Warsaw II players
Ekstraklasa players
I liga players
II liga players